"Lyubo, bratsy, lyubo" ( Lovely, brothers, lovely) is a traditional Cossack song known in Russian and Ukrainian languages. Its name derived from the first row of the refrain: Lyubo, bratsy, lyubo, lyubo, bratsy, zhit, that means "it is lovely to live, brothers". The song was first recorded by Ukrainian folklorists in the South of Kherson Oblast and was popular with Nestor Makhno's troops in Ukraine in the beginning of 1920s. It also became very popular in the Soviet Union during wartime after the release of the Soviet film Alexander Parkhomenko (1942) where it was performed in Russian by Boris Chirkov.

Synopsis 

The Cossacks (in some versions: Tatars, etc.) led 40,000 horses to the Terek River. After the bloody battle, one bank of the Terek is covered by the dead men and animals. The fatally wounded hero remembers about his wife, his mother, and his steed. Feeling sorrow for the two latter, he mourns his fate.

Historical background 
The phrase "Lyubo, bratsy, zhit'" appeared in a soldier song published in Biblioteka Dlya Chteniya, 1837.

According to several authors, the song is dedicated to the events of the Russian Civil War (1917 – 1922). Other sources mention it as a piece of Cossack folklore. The song was recorded in Ukrainian by folklorists in the South of Kherson Oblast and was popular with Nestor Makhno's troops in Ukraine in the beginning of 1920s.

The song became extremely popular after the release of the Soviet film Alexander Parkhomenko (1942) where it was performed by Boris Chirkov. In 1942 – 1943, a tankers adaptation was created, based on the Chirkov's version.

Performance 
The song was popularized by such well-known Russian and Soviet artists as the Kuban Cossack Choir, Zhanna Bichevskaya, Pelageya, etc.

See also 
Rozpryahayte, khloptsi, koni

References

External links 
 
 

Russian folk songs
Ukrainian folk songs
Anarchist songs